Zhangshu Township is a township under the administration of Hengyang County, in central Hunan, China. , it has one residential community and 5 villages under its administration.

References 

Townships of Hunan
Hengyang County